is a passenger railway station in located in the city of Higashiōmi,  Shiga Prefecture, Japan, operated by the private railway operator Ohmi Railway. Although Ohmi Railway uses the name Tarōbōgū-mae with long sound for the first "o" on its web page,

Lines
Tarōbōgūmae Station is served by the Ohmi Railway Yōkaichi Line, and is located 1.3 rail kilometers from the terminus of the line at Yōkaichi Station.

Station layout
The station consists of one side platform serving a single bi-directional track. The station is unattended.

Platforms

Adjacent stations

History
It was renamed to its present name on April 1, 1998.

Passenger statistics
In fiscal 2019, the station was used by an average of 415 passengers daily (boarding passengers only).

Surroundings
 Agata Jinja (Tarōbōgū)
 Japan National Route 421

See also
List of railway stations in Japan

References

External links

 Ohmi Railway official site 

Railway stations in Japan opened in 1913
Railway stations in Shiga Prefecture
Higashiōmi